In enzymology, a dethiobiotin synthase is an enzyme that catalyzes the chemical reaction

ATP + 7,8-diaminononanoate + CO2  ADP + phosphate + dethiobiotin

The 3 substrates of this enzyme are ATP, 7,8-diaminononanoate, and CO2, whereas its 3 products are ADP, phosphate, and dethiobiotin.

This enzyme belongs to the family of ligases, specifically the cyclo-ligases, which form carbon-nitrogen bonds.  The systematic name of this enzyme class is 7,8-diaminononanoate:carbon-dioxide cyclo-ligase (ADP-forming). This enzyme is also called desthiobiotin synthase.  This enzyme participates in biotin metabolism.

Structural studies

References

 
 

EC 6.3.3
Enzymes of known structure